Feitian Award for Outstanding Actor(中国电视剧飞天奖优秀男演员奖) is a main category of Feitian Awards.

2020s

2010s

2000s

1990s

1980s

Notes

References 

Actress
Television awards for Best Actor